Albizia lucidor is an Asian tree species in the Acacia clade.  No subspecies are listed in the Catalogue of Life.  In Vietnam it may be called bản xe (or đái bò).

Description
This tree species grows up to 40 m, in tropical forests up to 1200m altitude.  The leaves are (single) pinnate, in 1-3 pairs.  The seed pods are yellow and glabrous, typically 160-200 x 25-30mm, containing less than ten 8-9mm seeds.

References

External links
 

lucidior
Flora of Indo-China
Flora of Malesia
Trees of Vietnam
Fabales of Asia